Cecil Oerson (born 18 December 1978 in Springfontein, Free State) is a South African association football midfielder. He played for Bloemfontein Young Tigers, Bloemfontein Celtic and Moroka Swallows, and represented the Bafana Bafana once.

External links

1978 births
South African soccer players
Living people
Bloemfontein Celtic F.C. players
Moroka Swallows F.C. players
Association football midfielders
South Africa international soccer players